Yin Chengxin (born 5 February 1995) is a Chinese competitor in synchronised swimming.

She won two silver medals at the 2015 World Aquatics Championships, and one gold medal at the 2014 Asian Games.

References
Asian Games Profile

Living people
Chinese synchronized swimmers
1995 births
World Aquatics Championships medalists in synchronised swimming
Swimmers from Wuhan
Synchronized swimmers from Hubei
Artistic swimmers at the 2014 Asian Games
Asian Games medalists in artistic swimming
Synchronized swimmers at the 2015 World Aquatics Championships
Synchronized swimmers at the 2017 World Aquatics Championships
Synchronized swimmers at the 2016 Summer Olympics
Synchronized swimmers at the 2020 Summer Olympics
Olympic synchronized swimmers of China
Olympic silver medalists for China
Olympic medalists in synchronized swimming
Medalists at the 2016 Summer Olympics
Medalists at the 2020 Summer Olympics
Asian Games gold medalists for China
Medalists at the 2014 Asian Games
Medalists at the 2018 Asian Games
Artistic swimmers at the 2018 Asian Games
Artistic swimmers at the 2019 World Aquatics Championships